Relegence is an Israeli-based company specialized in Semantic Analysis (specifically, automated tagging and classification) and Content Trends Analysis.It was acquired by AOL on November 8, 2006. The Relegence Corporation was founded as Enow, Inc in 1999, providing a service called ChatScan and changed its name in 2002. Relegence uses a variety of Machine Learning and Natural Language Processing algorithms as well as human curated rules to provide the best semantic infrastructure for publishers and advertisers.

References

Financial services companies of the United States